Anna Maria Streżyńska (née Bajorek) (born 11 May 1967 in Warsaw, Poland) is a Polish politician. She was the Polish Minister of Digital Affairs between 16 November 2015 and 9 January 2018. Prior to becoming a government member, she was a senior adviser in the Ministry.

Streżyńska worked as a civil servant in telecoms and competition policy for much of her career. In 2017, she refused Deputy Prime Minister and Minister of Science and Higher Education Jarosław Gowin’s offer to join a newly formed “Christian Democratic” party titled “Porozumienie.”

On 9 January 2018 Streżyńska was recalled from the office of the Minister of Digital Affairs.

References

1967 births
Women government ministers of Poland
Living people
Politicians from Warsaw
21st-century Polish lawyers
University of Warsaw alumni
20th-century Polish lawyers
Polish women lawyers
20th-century women lawyers
21st-century women lawyers
20th-century Polish women